Vandellòs i l'Hospitalet de l'Infant is a municipality in the comarca of the Baix Camp in Catalonia, Spain. It is situated in the south-west of the comarca, between the Serra de Llaberia range and the coast. The town of Vandellòs is some 15 km inland, connected with the AP-7 autopista and the N-340 road (which run near to the coast) by the C-44 road. The town of L'Hospitalet de l'Infant is on the coast, and is an important tourist centre: it is served by a station on the RENFE railway line between Tarragona and Valencia.

History
In medieval times the town was part of the Barony of Entença.

Nuclear power stations
The nuclear power stations Vandellòs I and II are situated on the coast near l'Hospitalet de l'Infant.

Demography

See also
Fatges

References

 Panareda Clopés, Josep Maria; Rios Calvet, Jaume; Rabella Vives, Josep Maria (1989). Guia de Catalunya, Barcelona: Caixa de Catalunya.  (Spanish).  (Catalan).

External links 

Official website 
 Government data pages 

Municipalities in Baix Camp
Populated places in Baix Camp